Stassower See is a lake in the Rostock district in Mecklenburg-Vorpommern, Germany. At an elevation of 35.4 m, its surface area is 0.086 km².

Lakes of Mecklenburg-Western Pomerania